SRSD may stand for:

Seine River School Division in Lorette, Manitoba, Canada
Southern Regional School District in Manahawkin, New Jersey, USA
South Redford School District in Redford, Michigan, USA
Sto-Rox School District in Alleghany County, Pennsylvania, USA